Robert De Forest may refer to:

 Robert E. De Forest (1845–1924), American politician
 Robert W. DeForest (1848–1931), American lawyer, financier, and philanthropist